Harutaea is a genus of moths in the family Geometridae.

Species
 Harutaea conspicuaria (Leech, 1897)
 Harutaea flavizona Sato, 2000
 Harutaea sumatrana Sato, 2000

References

Boarmiini